Mary Taylor (born March 7, 1966) is an American businesswoman and politician who served as the 65th lieutenant governor of Ohio from 2011 to 2019.

She was most recently a candidate in the Republican Party primary for Governor of Ohio in the 2018 election.

Early life and business career
Taylor was born in 1966. She attended Springfield Local School District in Springfield Township. She attended the University of Akron, obtaining a bachelor's degree in Accounting and master's degree in Taxation. Becoming a Certified Public Accountant, she worked for Deloitte and Touche and Bober, Markey, Fedorovich & Company in Akron.

Political career
Taylor was first elected to the Green City Council, eventually being elected to the Ohio General Assembly to represent the 43rd district. In 2006, she was elected to serve as Ohio State Auditor, where she defeated Democratic candidate Barbara Sykes.  Taylor succeeded fellow Republican Betty Montgomery as state auditor in January 2007.  She was the only Republican in Ohio to be elected to a statewide non-judicial office during the 2006 election.

Lieutenant Governor

On January 14, 2010, she was announced as John Kasich's choice as lieutenant gubernatorial running mate in the 2010 election.

On November 2, 2010, Kasich defeated incumbent Governor Ted Strickland (D). Thus Taylor became the lieutenant governor on January 10, 2011.  She was named as Director of the Ohio Department of Insurance the same day.

Kasich and Taylor were re-elected in November 2014.

In 2011, it was reported that she on several occasions used the state airplane to run "personal errands." Governor Kasich stated he requested Taylor to refund the money.  Taylor stated that she had already refunded the money, even though the plane was only used for official business.

An analysis by USA Today's Cincinnati branch indicated unusually high turnover among her staff during her tenure as Lieutenant Governor.

2018 Ohio gubernatorial election 

On February 23, 2017 she formed a campaign committee to raise money and campaign in the 2018 Ohio gubernatorial election. She was endorsed by U.S. Senator Ted Cruz in April 2018. Taylor's campaign hired Axiom Strategies, a consulting firm, with close ties to Cruz. On May 8, 2018, Taylor lost the Republican Primary to Ohio Attorney General Mike DeWine, garnering 40.2% of the vote compared to DeWine's 59.8% of the vote.

Family
She is married to Donzell (Don) Taylor and has two sons, Joe (b. circa 1991) and Michael (b. circa 1994) and the family resides in Green. In 2017 she revealed that both her children have been struggling with opioid addiction.

Electoral history

See also
List of female lieutenant governors in the United States

References

External links
 Taylor for Governor website
 Official Biography from the State of Ohio website
 Biography on KasichForOhio.com
 Profile on the Ohio Ladies' Gallery website
 

|-

|-

1966 births
21st-century American politicians
21st-century American women politicians
John Kasich
Lieutenant Governors of Ohio
Living people
Republican Party members of the Ohio House of Representatives
People from Green, Ohio
State Auditors of Ohio
State insurance commissioners of the United States
University of Akron alumni
Women state legislators in Ohio